North Great George's Street is a street on the Northside of Dublin city first laid out in 1766 which connects Parnell Street with Great Denmark Street. It consists of opposing terraces of 4-storey over basement red-brick Georgian townhouses descending on an increasingly steep gradient from Belvedere House which bookends the street from a perpendicular aspect to the North.

All of the original houses on the street as well as several other features are listed on the Record of Protected Structures.

Name
There is some speculation over which George the street is named after however it is likely King George III who was reigning monarch at the time of the street's construction. The nearby Church of Ireland parish of St. George and both the earlier Old Church of St George (1668) on Hill Street (previously Lower Temple Street) and the newer church of St George (1802) at Hardwicke Place are within a short walk of the street and may have influenced the naming convention. The street was originally simply named George's Street prior to the laying out of South Great George's Street.

History

The street is situated on the grounds of the old Mount Eccles estate which had formed part of the extensive private estate of Sir John Eccles, Lord Mayor of Dublin in 1710. The street was laid out for development by Nicholas Archdall after Royal Assent was given on 7 June 1766 for long leases to be granted for the purposes of building and the directional layout still follows the route of the old driveway to Eccles House.

The street is similar in design and width to Henrietta Street and maintains many of its original features including granite paving, cast iron ornate coal holes and boot scrapers, cast iron ornate railings, grilles and gas lamp holders, original doors and ornately fenestrated fanlights, granite steps and granite coping along parapets, granite and calp stone-faced basements, some rusticated granite first floors, wooden sash windows and the original facades of most buildings. Many of the interiors still have original stucco work while others have original panelling and wainscotted walls from the Georgian era. Other features which were added during later periods have now become part of the historic fabric of the street including some of the Victorian era cast iron balconettes, cast iron lampposts and gas lamps from various different periods and various creeping plants which extend over the front of several buildings and change colour with the turning of the seasons.

As with many Georgian townhouses of the period the external appearance is subdued with plain red-brick facades however this often contrasts with elaborately decorated interiors with stuccoed walls and ceilings and ornate marble and Portland stone floor surfaces and carved wooden staircases. Interiors such as at number 19 were often designed and plastered by some of the leading craftsmen of their day such as Michael Stapleton and Andrew Callnan.

Having largely fallen into disrepair in the early 20th century, a group of conservationists from the Irish Georgian Society including politician David Norris were involved in restoring many of the buildings on the street. One group of houses towards the South end of the street owned by Dublin Corporation, which was leased to the Legion of Mary, became so derelict that they were demolished in 1984 despite objections and appeals for their preservation. They were later replaced with facsimile Georgian house frontage.

Residents
The street was originally built for the landed gentry and merchant families as a pied-a-terre and the largest house on the street, No. 43 was actually built from 1786 by the Rt. Hon Henry Theophilus Clements son of Nathaniel Clements who had developed

Henrietta Street. A number of hereditary peers also had properties on the street in the mid-18th century.

Other notable residents of the street have included;
 
 
  - lived at number 41, Kenmare House
  - born at number 2
 
 
 Richard Laurence and his butler Arthur Guinness resided at no.43
 
 
 
 Various Viscount Powerscourt and family
 
 
 Charles Thorp

See also
List of streets and squares in Dublin
 
 
 The Belvedere Hotel (Dublin)
 Belvedere College

References

Streets in Dublin (city)
Georgian architecture in Ireland